C-glycosyltryptophan is a sugar-loaded amino acid that strongly correlates with age.

References

Sugars
Chemistry